The Hines House was a historic building in Bowling Green, Kentucky, placed on the National Register of Historic Places on December 18, 1979.  It was built by and for the Reverend James Davis Hines around the year 1840.  Hines eventually sold the building to an N.E. Goodsall, whose heirs sold the house in 1859 to Doctor Albert Covington.

When added to the National Register, it was one of the few houses left in Bowling Green of that age and structure.  The house was destroyed by an intentionally set fire on 12 February 1995.

References

1995 crimes in the United States
1995 disestablishments in Kentucky
Buildings and structures demolished in 1995
National Register of Historic Places in Bowling Green, Kentucky
Buildings and structures in the United States destroyed by arson
Houses in Warren County, Kentucky
Houses on the National Register of Historic Places in Kentucky
Arson in Kentucky
Burned houses in the United States
Federal architecture in Kentucky
1840 establishments in Kentucky
Houses completed in 1840
Demolished but still listed on the National Register of Historic Places